ROKS Gang Gam-chan (DDH-979) is a  in the Republic of Korea Navy. She is named after Gang Gam-chan.

Design 
The KDX-II is part of a much larger build up program aimed at turning the ROKN into a blue-water navy. It is said to be the first stealthy major combatant in the ROKN and was designed to significantly increase the ROKN's capabilities.

Construction and career 
ROKS Gang Gam-chan was launched on 16 March 2006 by Daewoo Shipbuilding and commissioned on 1 October 2007.

Gang Gam-chan participated in the anti-piracy operations off Somalia alongside European Union Naval Force (EU NAVFOR) on March 26, 2014.

ROKS Gang Gam-chan has been sent on patrol duty to Gulf of Aden on 13 August 2019. She is in the Navy's anti-piracy Cheonghae Unit.

Gallery

References 

Chungmugong Yi Sun-shin-class destroyers
2006 ships 
Ships built by Daewoo Shipbuilding & Marine Engineering